Darzi Kola or Darzikola or Darzi Kala, also rendered as Darzi Kula, may refer to:
 Darzi Kola, Amol
 Darzi Kola-ye Aqa Shafi, Babol County
 Darzi Kola-ye Bozorg, Babol County
 Darzi Kola-ye Karim Kola, Babol County
 Darzi Kola-ye Kuchek, Babol County
 Darzikola-ye Akhund-e Baba, Babol County
 Darzikola-ye Akhundi-ye Bala, Babol County
 Darzikola-ye Akhundi-ye Pain, Babol County
 Darzikola-ye Nasirai, Babol County
 Darzikola-ye Navshirvan, Babol County
 Darzi Kola, Neka
 Darzi Kola, Nowshahr
 Darzi Kola, Sari
 Darzi Kola, Savadkuh